Carbäk is an Amt in the district of Rostock, in Mecklenburg-Vorpommern, Germany. The seat of the Amt is in Broderstorf.

The Amt Carbäk consists of the following municipalities:
 Broderstorf
 Poppendorf
 Roggentin
 Thulendorf

Ämter in Mecklenburg-Western Pomerania
Rostock (district)